Google Cloud Connect was a free cloud computing plug-in for Windows Microsoft Office 2003, 2007 and 2010 that can automatically store and synchronize any Microsoft Word document, PowerPoint presentation, or Excel spreadsheet to Google Docs in Google Docs or Microsoft Office formats. The Google Doc copy is automatically updated each time the Microsoft Office document is saved. Microsoft Office documents can be edited offline and synchronized later when online. Google Cloud Sync maintains previous Microsoft Office document versions and allows multiple users to collaborate, working on the same document at the same time. Google Cloud Connect was discontinued on April 30, 2013, as according to Google, all of Cloud Connect's features are available through Google Drive.

Features
Google Cloud Connect could automatically or manually synchronize changes made to a Microsoft Office 2003, 2007, or 2010 document with Google Docs. Documents can be secured for private access by one user, shared with specific people for collaboration, or made public to anyone. Previous document versions can be retrieved.

 Backup: Microsoft Office documents could be manually or automatically backed up to Google Docs each time they are saved locally. Video
 Synchronize: Changes made to an Office document on one computer can sync when the file is opened on another computer. Video
 Protect: Microsoft Office documents synced to Google Docs can be made accessible to one person.
 Share: Microsoft Office documents synced to Google Docs can be made accessible only to selected people. Video
 Edit: A shared document can be set to only be viewed by others or edited as well. Video
 Publish: Documents synced to Google Docs can effectively be published by making them accessible to anyone.
 Collaborate: Multiple users can work on the same document at the same time. Video
 Notify: When one person edits a document, others sharing the document receive an email letting them know. Video
 Print: Use Google Cloud Print to print to local or remote network connected printers.
 Compare: Previous version are maintained allowing users to compare to older versions. Video
 Roll back: Users can return to a previous version of the document.
 Green: Green computing allows documents to be shared without printing or sending large files. Only links need be sent.
 Mobilize: Google Sync allows synced documents to be viewed and edited with most internet connected mobile devices.
 Storage: 5GB of Google Drive storage is included for free. Currently, additional storage costs per month are: 25GB-$2.49, 100GB-$4.99, etc. up to 16TB.

See also
 Cloud computing security
 Cloud collaboration

References

External links
 Google blog re deprecation
 Google blog announcement article
 Google Cloud Connect Help and information for users (not working)
 Google Cloud Connect Help and information for administrators (not working)
 About Google Cloud Connect 

Cloud applications
Cloud Connect
Cloud Connect